This is a list of the Honduras national football team results from 2010 to 2019.

2010

2011
In January 2011, Honduras won its third Copa Centroamericana and their first one since 1995.

2012

2013

In 2013, Honduras qualified to their second straight FIFA World Cup and third total.  They also participated in the Copa Centroamericana and the CONCACAF Gold Cup where they finished runners-up and semifinalist respectively.

The Hexagonal, in 2013, marked many important events for Honduras.  In their opening game they achieved their first home victory against the United States.  Another major feat was a victory over Mexico in Estadio Azteca, effectively qualifying Honduras to the World Cup.  Another important event includes a record setting attendance for an association football game in the state of Florida, against Brazil.  This year also marks the first time Honduras faced Israel.

2014
In 2014 Honduras participated in their second straight FIFA World Cup and third total.  Honduras played France, Ecuador, and Switzerland in the Group E resulting with one goal by Carlo Costly, the third goal in Honduras' World Cup history.

After the World Cup, Honduras competed in the 2014 Copa Centroamericana.  This edition of the Copa Centroamericana was the first ever to be held outside the UNCAF nations.

2015
This year marked the end of Hernán Medford as head coach and the beginning of the Jorge Pinto era. In 2015 Honduras started playing in the 2015 CONCACAF Gold Cup play-off against French Guiana. In December 2015, Honduras reached its worst position ever in the FIFA World Rankings falling to the 101st place.

2016
In 2016 Honduras started playing in a friendly match against Nicaragua.  On 27 May, Honduras played Argentina away for the first time in a friendly game where they faced superstar Lionel Messi who had to leave the match early due to a back injury.  After a slow start in the group stage of the FIFA World Cup qualifiers, Honduras went to claim a berth to the fifth and last stage in the very last game against Mexico with a 0–0 drawn at Estadio Azteca, making this the second time in a row in which Honduras is able to harvest some points at this venue.

2017
Honduras started 2017 playing at Panama City against Nicaragua for the 2017 Copa Centroamericana, a cup which they eventually won, representing their 4th regional title.  On 24 March, Honduras suffered its biggest defeat ever in a FIFA World Cup qualification game after losing 0–6 against United States.  During the 2017 CONCACAF Gold Cup, Honduras drawn 0–0 in a Group A match against French Guiana.  A game in which the South Americans fielded an ineligible player.  Florent Malouda had made 80 appearances for France between 2004 and 2012; therefore violating FIFAs regulations.  Two days later, CONCACAF released a statement forfeiting the match by a 3–0 score to Honduras.  In the last match day of the 2018 World Cup qualifiers, Honduras defeated Mexico in San Pedro Sula and finished in 4th position.  For the first time, Honduras played in an Inter-confederation play-off against Australia, however, they failed to qualify to their third straight FIFA World Cup.

2018
After a painful elimination at the World Cup qualifying, Honduras resumed playing in 2018 with a couple of friendly matches between May and June.  In February, they announce their first exhibition match to be played against the South Korea national football team, followed by a friendly against El Salvador in the United States.  Honduras closed a quiet year with three friendlies against UAE, Panama and Chile with poor results.

2019

On 15 February, former Uruguayan footballer Fabián Coito was named new head coach of Honduras.  He made his official debut with a scoreless drawn in a friendly match against Ecuador.  This year will also mark the beginning of the new CONCACAF competition branded CONCACAF Nations League.  On 27 March, the draw for the group phase took place placing Honduras in Group C along Trinidad and Tobago and Martinique.

For the first time in CONCACAF history, Jamaica will host a CONCACAF Gold Cup match.  Honduras was placed in Group C against the Reggae Boyz, Curaçao and El Salvador for the 2019 edition.  Midfielders Rigoberto Rivas and Héctor Castellanos made their debuts in June in friendly matches against Paraguay and Brazil respectively.

Record
Record does not include matches against clubs or teams not affiliated to FIFA.
 As of 17 November 2019

References

2010s